Škvorec is a market town in Prague-East District in the Central Bohemian Region of the Czech Republic. It has about 2,000 inhabitants.

Administrative parts
The village of Třebohostice is an administrative part of Škvorec.

Geography
It lies on the border between the Prague Plateau and Benešov Uplands.

History

The first written mention of Škvorec is from 1279. In 1497, King Vladislaus II promoted Škvorec into a market town. The market town was acquired by Albrecht von Wallenstein in 1621, but he sold it to Karl I, Prince of Liechtenstein a year later. He joined it to the Kostelec estate.

Sights
Škvorec Castle, also known as Savoia Castle, is the main landmark of Škvorec. Today it is privately owned and used as a hotel and restaurant.

References

External links

Market towns in the Czech Republic